Sherene is a Persian female given name. It is popular in Iran, Afghanistan, Tajikistan and other Persian speaking countries. It is also adopted by the Arabs and used in Arab world as well as South Asia. People named Sherene include:

Given name
Sherine, full name Sherine Sayed Mohammed Abdel Wahab (born 1980), Egyptian singer, actress and TV show host
Sherine Abeyratne, Australian singer
Sherine Obare, American chemist
Sherine Tadros, British journalist
Sherine Wagdy, Egyptian singer
Sherine Wong (born 1979), Miss Malaysia 1996

Surname
Ariane Sherine (born 1980), British musical stand-up comedian, comedy writer and journalist

See also
Arabic name
Persian name

References

Arabic feminine given names
Iranian feminine given names